Henry Alexander Woodd (6 June 1865 – 6 November 1954) was an Australian Anglican priest. Woodd was born in Liverpool, Sydney, New South Wales, and died in Newcastle, New South Wales.

References

Australian Anglican priests
Australian people of English descent
1865 births
1954 deaths
Clergy from Sydney